Levant Cave is a cave in the British Overseas Territory of Gibraltar. Together with Tina's Fissure and George's Bottom Cave, Levant Cave is part of a close group of three caves at the southern end of the Upper Rock Nature Reserve.

The "Levant series of caves" consists of Levant Cave, George's Bottom Cave, and Gibbon's Cave. Levant Cave was discovered in a similar way to Lower St. Michael's Cave as they were both discovered during military tunnelling. In the case of Levant Cave the Royal Engineers were tunnelling to build a command centre for the 9.2 inch gun at Levant Battery. The tunnelling damaged the cave but some attractive formations remain.

See also
List of caves in Gibraltar

References

Caves of Gibraltar